Ariamnes melekalikimaka is a species of comb-footed spider in the family Theridiidae. It is found in Hawaii.

References

Theridiidae
Spiders described in 2007
Spiders of Hawaii